Charles Skinner may refer to:
Charles R. Skinner (1844–1928), U.S. Representative from New York
Charles Montgomery Skinner (1852–1907), American writer
Charles Nelson Skinner (1833–1910), Canadian lawyer, judge, and politician
Charles Skinner (geologist)